Srinivasapuram (சீனிவாசபுரம்) is a slum located in Chennai, Tamil Nadu, India.  It is centered between Santhome and Adyar, along the shore of the sea. It has a large population of fishermen. The slum was seriously affected by the 2004 Indian Ocean tsunami. As of 2011, it has a population of 299.

Education
Sri Venkateswara Matriculation Higher Secondary School

References

Neighbourhoods in Chennai